Zeopoecilus is a genus of beetles in the family Carabidae, containing the following species:

 Zeopoecilus calcaratus (Sharp 1886)
 Zeopoecilus caperatus Johns, 2007
 Zeopoecilus putus (Broun 1882)

References

Pterostichinae